Bobby Previte (born July 16, 1951 in Niagara Falls, New York) is a drummer, composer, and bandleader. He  earned a degree in economics from the University at Buffalo, where he also studied percussion. He moved to New York City in 1979 and began professional relationships with John Zorn, Wayne Horvitz, and Elliott Sharp.

Composer

While Previte is a talented drummer he has also received critical acclaim for his "exceptional abilities as a composer and orchestrator." A review of his 1988 album Claude's Late Morning reports that "Perhaps most striking is Previte's skill in composing music that fully integrates these disparate instruments — including drums and drum machine, electric guitar and keyboards, trombone, harp, accordion, banjo, pedal steel guitar, tuba, and harmonica — while emphasizing each instrument's unique, individual sound." Another critic notes Previte's "driving and propulsive compositions, featuring both fiery jazz expressionism and layered counterpoint that suggested elements of contemporary minimalism.

Previte's compositions are often tightly arranged, although they leave room for significant amounts of improvisation. Additionally, Previte often uses unusual instrumentation and also draws on many non-jazz musics for his compositions.

In 1991, he wrote the score for "Cirk Valentin" (Moscow Circus on Stage), a stage show consisting of circus acts created by Valentin Gneushev that performed at the Gershwin Theatre on Broadway.

Recent large-scale compositional works as of Spring 2007 include:
"The Constellations Ensemble," a chamber group touring the multi-media show, The 23 Constellations of Joan Miró.
"The Separation," a collaboration with writer/director Andrea Kleine "dealing with the role of religion in society. Based on the 15th-century composer Guilliaume Dufay's Missa Sancti Jacobi and written for early music pioneers the Rose Ensemble with electric band."

Previte is currently working on a series of percussion concertos featuring So Percussion ensemble and solo improvisers scheduled to premiere in 2011.

Performer
Previte has received excellent reviews and full articles in major newspapers such as The New York Times, The Washington Post and The Guardian for playing a wide range of genres and venues and for qualities as diverse as his intellectual aesthetic to his ability "to groove." Recent and current projects as of Spring 2007 include :
"Dialed In," a solo electronic drum show collaboration with video artist Benton C Bainbridge.
The Coalition of the Willing, a guitar quartet featuring Charlie Hunter, Steven Bernstein and Jamie Saft.
"Strike," a new quartet with organist Marco Benevento and two saxophones.
"Groundtruther," a duo with Hunter.
"The Beta Popes," a power trio with Skerik and Saft.
"Swami LatePlate," a duo with Jamie Saft.

Much of Previte's work is also improvisational. One of Previte's own favorite recorded improvisational collaborations was with John Zorn, "Euclid's Nightmare" (Depth of Field 1997). In the 1990s, he performed with the Seattle-based 100% improvisational musical collective Ponga with Wayne Horvitz, Skerik, and Dave Palmer. Previte has collaborated with Jamie Saft as "Swami Late Plate." Also the improvisational Bobby Previte, Jamie Saft, Skerik: Live in 2003 (DVD - Word Public) was released in 2006. April In New York, is a 5-DVD set released 2007 of improvisational duets.

Previte appeared in the movie Short Cuts directed by Robert Altman.

In 1997 he founded the record company and label Depth of Field.

Discography

As leader/co-leader
 1980: Pull to Open (Zoar)
 1985: Bump the Renaissance (Sound Aspects)
 1987: Pushing the Envelope (Gramavision)
 1987: Dull Bang, Gushing Sound, Human Shriek (Dossier)
 1988: Claude's Late Morning (Gramavision)
 1990: Empty Suits (Gramavision)
 1991: Weather Clear, Track Fast (Enja)
 1991: Music of the Moscow Circus (Gramavision)
 1993: Slay the Suitors (Avant) with Empty Suits
 1993: Hue and Cry (Enja) with Weather Clear, Track Fast
 1996: Too Close to the Pole (Enja) with Weather Clear, Track Fast
 1997: Euclid's Nightmare (Depth of Vision) with John Zorn
 1997: My Man in Sydney (Enja) with Latin for Travelers
 1998: In the Grass (Enja) with Marc Ducret
 1998: Downtown Lullaby (Depth of Vision) with John Zorn, Wayne Horvitz and Elliott Sharp
 1998: Dangerous Rip (Enja) with Latin for Travelers
 2002: The 23 Constellations of Joan Miró (Tzadik)
 2002: Just Add Water (Palmetto) with Bump
 2002: The Prisoner's Dilemma (Church of Grob) with Elliott Sharp
 2003: Counterclockwise (Palmetto) with Bump
 2003: Come in Red Dog, This Is Tango Leader (Ropeadope) with Charlie Hunter
 2004: Latitude (Thirsty Ear) as Groundtruther with Charlie Hunter and special guest Greg Osby
 2005: Longitude (Thirsty Ear) as Groundtruther with Charlie Hunter and special guest DJ Logic
 2006: The Coalition of the Willing (Ropeadope)
 2007: Altitude (Thirsty Ear) as Groundtruther with Charlie Hunter and special guest John Medeski
 2007: Doom Jazz (Veal) as Swami Lateplate with Jamie Saft
 2008: Set the Alarm for Monday (Palmetto) with The New Bump
 2008: White Hate (Veal) as Beta Popes with Jamie Saft and Skerik
 2008: Live Hate (Veal) as Beta Popes with Jamie Saft and Skerik
 2008: Big Guns (Auand) with Gianluca Petrella and Antonello Salis
 2009: Pan Atlantic (Auand)
 2012: Plutino (Spacebone)
 2014: Terminals (Cantaloupe) with Sō Percussion, Zeena Parkins, Greg Osby, Nels Cline and John Medeski
 2015: We Two Kings: Charlie Hunter and Bobby Previte Play the Great Carols (Rank Hypocrisy) with Charlie Hunter
 2016: Mass (RareNoise) with The Rose Ensemble, Stephen O'Malley, Marco Benevento, Don McGreevy, Mike Gamble, Jamie Saft, Reed Mathis

DVD
 2006: Live in Japan 2003 (Word Public) with Jamie Saft and Skerik
 2007: April in New York with Skerik, Zeena Parkins, Benton C Bainbridge, Elliott Sharp, and Marco Benvento
 2007: The Separation (Rank Hypocrisy) with Andrea Kleine

As sideman
With Terry Adams
Terrible (New World, 1995)
With Ray Anderson
Where Home Is (Enja, 1999)
Sweet Chicago Suite (Intuition, 2012)
With The Bang
Omonimo (Nuevo, 1991)
With Bob Belden
 Black Dahlia (Blue Note, 2001)
With Marco Benevento
Live at Tonic (Ropeadope, 2006)
With Tim Berne
Pace Yourself (JMT, 1991)
Nice View (JMT, 1994)
With Jane Ira Bloom
The Nearness (Arabesque, 1996)
The Red Quartets (Arabesque, 1999)
Sometimes the Magic (Arabesque, 2001)
Chasing Paint (Arabesque, 2003)
Like Silver, Like Song (Arabesque, 2004)
Wingwalker (Outline, 2011)
Early Americans (Outline, 2016)
Wild Lines: Improvising Emily Dickenson (Outline, 2017)
With William S. Burroughs
Dead City Radio (Island, 1990)
With Corporate Art
Corporate Art (JMT, 1991)
With Paul Dresher and Ned Rothenberg
Opposites Attract (New World/CounterCurrents, 1991)With Marty EhrlichPliant Plaint (Enja, 1988)
The Traveller's Tale (Enja, 1990)
Can You Hear a Motion? (Enja, 1994)
Malinke's Dance (OmniTone, 1999)
The Long View (Enja, 2002)With Carol EmanuelTops of Trees (Evva, 1995)With David FultonMarcos & Harry (Dossier, 1988)With David GarlandTogetherness: Control Songs, Vol. 2 (Ergodic, 1999)With Jerome HarrisHidden in Plain View (New World)With Robin HolcombLarks, They Crazy (Sound Aspects, 1988)With Lindsey HornerDon't Count On Glory (Cadence Jazz, 2005)With Bill HorvitzSolo Electric Guitar Compositions for an 11-Solo Guitar & Ensemble Piece Ensemble (Ear-Rational, 1991)With Wayne HorvitzNine Below Zero (Sound Aspects, 1986)
The President (Dossier, 1987)
Todos Santos (Sound Aspects, 1988)
Bring Yr Camera (Elektra/Musician, 1988)
Miracle Mile (Elektra/Musician, 1992)
Mylab (Terminus, 2004) with Tucker MartineWith Charlie HunterLet the Bells Ring On (There, 2015)
Everybody Has a Plan Until They Get Punched in the Mouth (GroundUP, 2016)With Yoko KannoCowboy Bebop Vitaminless (Victor [Japan], 1998)
Cowboy Bebop No Disc (Victor [Japan], 1998)
Cowboy Bebop Blue (Victor [Japan], 1999)With Guy KlucevsekFlying Vegetables of the Apocalypse (Experimental Intermedia Foundation, 1991)
Polka Dots & Laser Beams (Eva, 1991)
?Who Stole the Polka? (Eva, 1991)With Makigami KoichiKoroshi No Blues (Toshiba EMI, 1992)With The New York Composers OrchestraThe New York Composers Orchestra (New World, 1990)
First Program in Standard Time (New World/CounterCurrents, 1992) With Kirk NurockRemembering Tree Friends (Koch, 1998)With Seigen OnoNekonoTopia NekonoMania (Saidera, 1990)
Bar Del Mattatoio (Saidera, 1994)
Montreux 93/94 (Saidera, 1990)With the Peggy Stern/Thomas Chapin QuintetThe Fuchsia (Koch, 1997)With PongaPonga (Loosegroove, 1999)
The Ponga Remixes (Loosegroove, 1999)
Psychological (P-Vine, 2000)With Mike PrideDrummer's Corpse (AUM Fidelity, 2013)With Bobby RadcliffEarly in the Morning (A-Okay, 1985)With Jamie SaftBlack Shabbis (Tzadik, 2009)
A Bag of Shells (Tzadik, 2010)
The New Standard (RareNoise, 2014) with Steve Swallow
Loneliness Road (RareNoise, 2017) with Steve Swallow and Iggy PopWith Jeffrey SchanzerVistas (Music Vistas, 1987)With Elliott SharpVirtual Stance (Dossier, 1985)
Fractal (Dossier, 1986)
Larynx (SST, 1987)
Sili/Contemp/Tation (Ear-Rational, 1990)
Arc 1: I/S/M 1980-1983 (Atavistic, 1996)
Arc 2: The Seventies 1972-79 (Atavistic, 1997)With The Sonny Clark Memorial QuartetVoodoo (Black Saint, 1986)With Various ArtistsLost in the Stars: The Music of Kurt Weill (A&M, 1985)
Island of Sanity: New Music From New York City (No Man's Land, 1987)
Weird Nightmare: Meditations on Mingus (Columbia, 1992)
Music from and Inspired by the Film Short Cuts (Imago, 1992)  With Tom VarnerCovert Action (New Note, 1989)With  Tom WaitsRain Dogs (Island, 1985)With Victoria WilliamsHappy Come Home (Geffen, 1987)With Andreas WillersCityscapes (Sound Aspects, 1993)With John Zorn'The Big Gundown (Nonesuch/Icon, 1985)Cobra (Hat ART, 1987)Spillane (Elektra/Nonesuch, 1987)The Bribe (Tzadik, 1986 [1998])Filmworks VII: Cynical Hysterie Hour (CBS/Sony (Japan), 1989)Filmworks 1986–1990 (Eva, 1990)Filmworks III: 1990–1995'' (Evva, 1995)

References

External links
 BobbyPrevite.com
 Discography by Patrice Roussel

American jazz bandleaders
American jazz composers
American male jazz composers
American jazz drummers
University at Buffalo alumni
1951 births
Living people
Musicians from Niagara Falls, New York
Palmetto Records artists
Tzadik Records artists
Ropeadope Records artists
Musicians from New York (state)
20th-century American drummers
American male drummers
Jazz musicians from New York (state)
20th-century American male musicians
The Coalition of the Willing (band) members
Ponga (band) members
Thirsty Ear Recordings artists
Enja Records artists
Gramavision Records artists
RareNoiseRecords artists